Qərvənd is a village and municipality in the Agdam Rayon of Azerbaijan. It has a population of 2,804.  The municipality consists of the villages of Orta Qərvənd, Ayaq Qərvənd, Çıraxlı, and Kolqışlaq.

References

Populated places in Aghdam District